El Husseiniya is a city located in the Sharqia Governorate, Egypt. It was named after Sultan Hussein Kamel.

History
The modern city occupies a place of the ancient town Buto ("the house of Wadjet"). The city consists of many Roman, Greek and Egyptian antiquities.

Geography
The city is approximately 1559 square kilometers and thus covers around 31% of the total area of the governorate, and is considered to be the biggest province.

Climate
Summer average temperatures are a low of 22 °C and a high of 33 °C. In the winter, the province experiences some rain.

References

Sharqia Governorate
Populated places in Sharqia Governorate